"Fool's Gold" is a single by American pop musician Aaron Carter released on April 1, 2016. It is the first single to be released by Carter since 2002. The song appears on Carter's extended play LøVë and his 2018 album of the same name.

Background and release
Carter began to tease the single in November 2015 via Twitter. On November 24, 2015, Billboard premiered a preview of the song. The song and its accompanying music video, co-directed by Carter and Jon Asher, were released on April 1, 2016.

References

2016 singles
2016 songs
Aaron Carter songs
Songs written by Melanie Fontana
Songs written by Jon Asher